Riley is an unincorporated community located in the town of Springdale, Dane County, Wisconsin, United States.

History
A post office called Riley was established in 1882, and remained in operation until it was discontinued in 1940. The community was named for the Riley brothers, land owners.

Notes

Unincorporated communities in Dane County, Wisconsin
Unincorporated communities in Wisconsin